Ritwik is a Bengali theatre group of Berhampur, West Bengal, India. The group was formed in 1980. The theatre group has staged more than 20 productions. Goutam Roychowdhury was director of this group who expired on 24 June 2011.

Productions 
Sinhasan(1980) Jaamgachh(1981)
Nichhak Vooter Gappo Noi (1982)
Bhoot (1982)
Pratikriya (1983)
Strir Patra (1985)
Taser Desh (1986)
Kaler Mandira (1986)
Gora (1992)
Chhoto Sukh (1993)
Karl Marx (1995)
Bisarjan (1996)
Seema Chouhuddi (1998)
Bipanna Bhoome (1999)
Atmobimbo (2001)
Minira Voleni (2002)
Byas (2003)
Meghboti (2003)
Marutrish (2004)
Doodh Maa(2004)
Bharat Puran(2005)
Deshodrohi (2006)
Kusum Kotha (2006)
Chaturanga (2007)
Phoolmoti (2008)
Antor Andor (2009)
Dibaratrir Kavya (2009)
Dakghar (2010)(Gautam Roy Chowdhury's last direction)
Ebang Sesh Adhyai (2011)
Sesh Raxa (2011)
Jagaran Pala (2012)
Adi Raja(2013–14)
Kankal (2013–14)
 Aandhare surya (2015)
 Ghost (2016)
Juto (2016)
CHAMPABATI (2017)
Tusher Agun (2018)
Angan Natok:
Hallabol (1989)
Ajodhyar Lajja (1992)
Rakto Trisha (1996)
30se January(1998)
Sagarparer Rajkanya (2000)
Haripada Mishtri (2000)
Jatugriha (2002)
Saharjadir Galpo (2003)
Workshop Based Productions:
WWW.COM (2010)
Hamliner Banshiwala (2010)
Ek Dhama Alu (2011)
Bagha Tetuler Gappo (2011)
Chandalika (2011)
Dharmaputra (2013)
Abu Hossain(2014)
 Kali Thali Mahatta (2015)
Jiyon Kanya (2016)
De Ma Pagal Kore (2018)

References

External links 

Bengali theatre groups